The 1944 South Dakota gubernatorial election was held on November 7, 1944. Incumbent Republican Governor Merrell Q. Sharpe ran for re-election to a second term. He was opposed Lynn Fellows, a former State Representative from Aurora County the 1942 Democratic nominee for Attorney General, in the general election; both Sharpe and Fellows won their primaries unopposed. In the general election, Sharpe easily defeated Fellows, far outpacing even Republican presidential nominee Thomas E. Dewey, who won the state in a landslide.

Results

References

Bibliography
 

1944
South Dakota
Gubernatorial
November 1944 events